Dugu Qiubai is a fictional character who is mentioned by name in three wuxia novels by Jin Yong (Louis Cha). He does not appear directly in any of the novels because he lived in an era long before the events of the novels took place. Nicknamed "Sword Devil" to reflect his prowess in and devotion to the practice of swordplay, he attains the philosophical level of "swordsmanship without a sword", which means that he uses swordplay techniques in combat without the physical existence of a sword.

Name 
Dugu Qiubai's family name Dugu (literally "alone") suggests that he was ethnically Xianbei; his given name "Qiubai" literally means "seek defeat". His full name thus roughly translates to "A Loner Who Seeks Defeat", representing his status as an invincible swordsman haunted by solitude, as no one can defeat or equal him in swordplay.

Fictional character biography 
The Return of the Condor Heroes
In this novel, set in the late Song dynasty ( mid 13th century), Yang Guo inherits Dugu Qiubai's Heavy Sword Technique. He encounters the Condor, a giant eagle-like creature that was once a companion of Dugu Qiubai. The Condor saves Yang Guo after he loses his arm, and leads him to Dugu Qiubai's Tomb of Swords. Yang Guo learns Dugu Qiubai's skills with the help of the Condor and inherits the Heavy Iron Sword. The Heavy Sword Technique has a rigorous requirement on inner energy, emphasising simple swings and moves accompanied by potent inner energy exertion. Although it lacks the fancy and stylish movements of typical swordplay styles, it is more effective than the most complicated form of sword attacks. When Yang Guo is learning this technique, he notes that he can break average swords immediately when he channels his inner energy into the Heavy Iron Sword during duels. The sword's weight would also boost the power of his swings and thrusts. Yang Guo masters the inner energy technique used by Dugu Qiubai and fulfils the requirement.

The Smiling, Proud Wanderer
Dugu Qiubai's swordplay technique, the Nine Swords of Dugu, is featured in this novel. The protagonist, Linghu Chong, learns this technique from the reclusive swordsman Feng Qingyang, and uses it to counter its "evil" counterpart, the Bixie Swordplay.

The Deer and the Cauldron
In a very brief inner monologue, Chengguan, a knowledgeable but naïve Shaolin monk, ponders about two great swordsmen in the past who fought with swords without following any defined stances: Dugu Qiubai and Linghu Chong.

Nine Swords of Dugu
Created by Dugu Qiubai, the Nine Swords of Dugu are nine independent sword stances created to overpower all sorts of weapons, including swords, sabers, spears, clubs, staffs, whips and arrows, as well as barehanded attacks. This swordplay has nine stances, each of which is designed to counter a particular style of martial arts. The mastery of all nine forms allows the swordsman to counter a wide range of moves, including those involving the use of weapons. The first core element of the swordplay is speed. The swordsman is trained to quickly predict and identify the weaknesses in the moves executed by an opponent, and then attack those weak points. The second core element of the swordplay is its formless nature and adaptability. Unlike typical martial arts styles described in wuxia stories, the moves of the Nine Swords of Dugu do not follow any fixed sequence or pattern. As such, it is impossible for an opponent to predict and counter correspondingly the moves of the swordplay. The key to mastering the swordplay is to understand the two core elements instead of rigidly memorising all the stances. Once the swordsman has grasped the essence of the swordplay, he can use it in endless forms and variations, hence the swordplay has no fixed sequence or pattern. During combat, the less the swordsman remembers, the less restricted he is by the original stances. He is thus able to customise and adapt the swordplay accordingly.

The nine stances are:

 General Index Stance
 Sword-defeating Stance
 Saber-defeating Stance
 Spear-defeating Stance
 Mace-defeating Stance
 Whip-defeating Stance
 Palm-defeating Stance
 Arrow-defeating Stance
 Qi-defeating Stance

Tomb of Swords 
Dugu Qiubai's final resting place is known as the Tomb of Swords. In The Return of the Condor Heroes the Condor leads Yang Guo to the Tomb, where Yang Guo reads a statement which Dugu Qiubai carved in stone: 

Yang Guo also read this at the Tomb of Swords:

Notes

References
  Tan, Xianmao (2005). Dugu Qiubai: The Image of a Lonely Genius Comes to Live. In Rankings of Jin Yong's Characters. Chinese Agricultural Press.

Literary characters introduced in 1959
Condor Trilogy
Jin Yong characters
The Return of the Condor Heroes
Fictional jianke
The Smiling, Proud Wanderer
Fictional Chinese people